Brex Arena Utsunomiya is an arena in Utsunomiya, Tochigi, Japan. It is the home arena of the Link Tochigi Brex of the B.League, Japan's professional basketball league.

Facilities
Main arena - 38m×50m
Sub arena - 28m×34m
Budojo - 22m×27m

References

Basketball venues in Japan
Indoor arenas in Japan
Utsunomiya Brex
Sports venues in Tochigi Prefecture